Gymnosoma rotundatum is a parasitoid fly found in Great Britain and Ireland.

References

Phasiinae
Diptera of Europe
Diptera of Asia
Insects described in 1758
Taxa named by Carl Linnaeus